An environmental award is usually awarded for activities that lead to the protection of the environment. The awards may be open to the global community or only within a particular country or field of work.

Notable global environmental awards
 The United Nations Environment Programme (UNEP) established the Global 500 Roll of Honour in 1987 to recognise the environmental achievements of individuals and organizations around the world.
 Ramsar Wetland Conservation Award
 Goldman Environmental Prize
 Earthshot Prize established in 2021 by The Royal Foundation.

See also
 Environmental issue
 Environmentalism
 List of environmental awards
 Sustainability

References

External links

Awards at the United Nations Environment Programme
EnvironmentAwards.net
European Business Awards for the Environment at the European Commission